Parlin is an unincorporated community and a U.S. Post Office in Gunnison County, Colorado, United States. The Parlin Post Office has the ZIP Code 81239.

Geography
Parlin is located at  (38.503042, -106.726170).

History
The town is named after rancher John Tufts Parlin who moved to the area from Maine in 1876.  The Parlin ranch was called the 76 ranch and cattle were all branded with the numbers "76". County Road 76 is named after the ranch. The local hot springs, Waunita Hot Springs is named after Parlin's niece, Waunita.

Climate
Climate type is dominated by the winter season, a long, bitterly cold period with short, clear days, relatively little precipitation mostly in the form of snow, and low humidity. The Köppen Climate Classification sub-type for this climate is "Dfc" (Continental Subarctic Climate).

See also
 List of cities and towns in Colorado
 Old Spanish Trail (trade route)

References

Unincorporated communities in Gunnison County, Colorado
Unincorporated communities in Colorado